This is a list of broadcasters of the 2010 Commonwealth Games held in Delhi, India from 3–14 October 2010. The host broadcast activities were provided by SIS Live, the production house, in partnership with Prasar Bharati, the host broadcaster.

Background
In New Zealand, the rights were first won by TVNZ. In September 2009, it was reported that TVNZ were seeking to offload the rights to SKY TV to avoid a NZ$5 million loss in the event, and the deal was confirmed in January 2010, backed by the country's government. Although Sky is a pay television broadcaster, they still promised that the coverage would be broadcast free-to-air.

Broadcasters

References

2010 Commonwealth Games
Broadcasters